A spa town is a resort town based on a mineral spa (a developed mineral spring). Patrons visit spas to "take the waters" for their purported health benefits. 

Thomas Guidott set up a medical practice in the English town of Bath in 1668. He became interested in the curative properties of the hot mineral waters there and in 1676 wrote A discourse of Bathe, and the hot waters there. Also, Some Enquiries into the Nature of the water. This brought the purported health-giving properties of the waters to the attention of the aristocracy, who started to partake in them soon after.

The term spa is used for towns or resorts offering hydrotherapy, which can include cold water or mineral water treatments and geothermal baths.

Argentina
Termas de Rio Hondo
Presidencia Roque Sáenz Peña

Australia
There are mineral springs in the Central Highlands of Victoria. Most are in and around Daylesford and Hepburn Springs. Daylesford and Hepburn Springs call themselves 'Spa Country' and the 'Spa Centre of Australia'.

In Queensland, many towns have mineral springs created by artesian bores into the Great Artesian Basin, often the only or primary water supply to the towns. Some of these towns had periods of popularity as spa towns, including Ararmac, Barcaldine, Dalby, Helidon, Innot Hot Springs, and Muckadilla, mostly in the late 1800s and early 1900s when mineral spas were believed to cure various medical conditions. However, the remote locations of most of these towns made them expensive to visit and only small-scale spa facilities developed there. Helidon, a day trip from Brisbane by car, was more successful, particularly with growing owernship of cars after World War II. However, concerns about radioactivity and bacterial contamination resulted in the Helidon Spa falling into disuse by 1994. Many towns in Queensland continue to provide bathing facilities fed by hot springs, but these are promoted as relaxing holiday activities rather than as medical treatments.

Belgium
 Chaudfontaine (whose name literally means "hot fountain" in French)
 Ostend
 Spa

Bosnia and Herzegovina

 Banja Slatina, Slatina - Slatina is a spa town, well-known as one of the best health resorts for rheumatism in the region. Slatina has a tradition since 1870s.
Banja Vrućica, Teslić

Brazil

Brazil has a growing number of spa towns. The traditional ones are: Águas de Lindoia, Serra Negra, Águas de São Pedro, Caxambu, Poços de Caldas, Caldas Novas, Araxá, and São Lourenço.

Bulgaria

Bulgaria is known for its more than 500 mineral springs, including the hottest spring in the Balkans at Sapareva Banya - 103 °C. Other famous spa towns include Sandanski, Hisarya, Bankya, Devin, Kyustendil, Varshets, Velingrad.

In Bulgarian, the word for a spa is баня (transliterated banya).

Canada

Harrison Hot Springs is one of the oldest among 18 in British Columbia; there are also two in Alberta and one in Ontario.

Croatia

In Croatia, the word Toplice implies a spa town. The most famous spa towns in Croatia are Daruvar, Šibenik and Sisak.

Czech Republic

In Czech, the word Lázně implies a spa town. The most famous spa towns in Czech Republic are Teplice and the West Bohemian Spa Triangle of Karlovy Vary,  Františkovy Lázně and Mariánské Lázně.

Finland
Traditionally, Hanko, Rauma and Kalajoki have been considered spa towns. Today there are more than 50 spas (kylpylä) in Finland; some towns known for their spa centers include Ikaalinen, Naantali and Imatra.

France

In France, the words bains, thermes, and eaux in city names often imply a spa town. There are more than 50 spa towns in France, including Vichy, Aix-les-Bains, Bagnoles-de-l'Orne, Dax, and Enghien-les-Bains.

Georgia 
Borjomi is one such example in south Georgia.

Germany

In Germany, the word Bad implies a spa town. Among the many famous spa towns in Germany are Bad Aachen, Baden-Baden, Bad Brückenau, Bad Ems, Bad Homburg, Bad Honnef, Bad Kissingen, Bad Kreuznach, Bad Mergentheim, Bad Muskau, Bad Oeynhausen, Bad Pyrmont, Bad Reichenhall, Bad Saarow, Bad Schandau, Bad Schönborn, Bad Segeberg, Bad Soden, Bad Tölz, Bad Wildbad, Bad Wimpfen, Bad Wildstein, Berchtesgaden, Binz, Freudenstadt, Heiligendamm, Heringsdorf, Kampen, Königstein, Radebeul, Schwangau, St. Blasien, Titisee, Tegernsee, Travemünde and Zingst. Wiesbaden is the largest spa town in Germany.

Greece

The most popular spa towns in Greece are Aidipsos,  Agkistro, Serres, Loutraki, Kamena Vourla, Kimolos, Loutra Kyllinis, Sidirokastro, Serres, Lakkos Milos, Loutrochori, Aridaia, Pella (Pozar)

Hungary

In Hungary, the word fürdő or the more archaic füred ("bath"), fürdőváros ("spa town") or fürdőhely ("bathing place") implies a spa town. Hungary is rich in thermal waters with health benefits, and many spa towns are popular tourist destinations. Budapest has several spas, including Turkish style spas dating back to the 16th century. Eger also has a Turkish spa. Other famous spas include the ones at Hévíz, Harkány, Bük, Hajdúszoboszló, Gyula, Bogács, Bükkszék, Zalakaros, the Cave Bath at Miskolctapolca and the Zsóry-fürdő at Mezőkövesd.

Indonesia
 Bali
 Batam

Italy

In Italy, spa towns, called città termale (from Latin thermae), are very numerous all over the country because of the intense geological activity of the territory. These places were known and used since the Roman age.

Japan

Kazakhstan
Burabay, lies in the Kokshetau Mountains, part of the Kokshetau Hills of the Kazakh Uplands (Saryarka).

Luxembourg
 Mondorf-les-Bains

Lithuania
 Druskininkai - is known for mineral springs. The name comes from Lithuanian word druska - salt.
 Birštonas - is known for mineral springs and curative mud applications.

Netherlands
 Bad Nieuweschans in the North on the border with Germany, with "Bad" implying a spa town.
 Valkenburg near Maastricht, which wants to be a "city of wellness".

New Zealand
Rotorua
Hanmer Springs
Ngawha Springs
Te Aroha Hot Springs Domain

Poland

Most spa towns in Poland are located in the Lesser Poland and Lower Silesian Voivodeships. Some of them have an affix "Zdrój" in their name (written with hyphen or separately), meaning "water spring", to denote their spa status, but this is not a general rule (e.g. Ciechocinek and Inowrocław are spa towns, but do not use the affix).

Portugal

Portugal is well known by famous spa towns throughout of the country.

Due to its high quality, as well as the landscape where are located, the most important ones are: 
Caldas da Rainha
Caldas das Taipas
Caldas de Monchique
 Termas do Gerês
Caldas de Vizela
Pedras Salgadas
Vidago
Chaves
São Pedro do Sul
Caldas da Felgueira located in Viseu District, and 5km from Nelas town.
Termas de Monfortinho
Caldas de São Jorge

Romania

In Romania, the word Băile implies a spa town. The most famous spa towns in Romania are Băile Herculane, Băile Felix, Mangalia, Covasna, Călimănești & Borsec.

Serbia

Serbia is known for its many spa cities. Some of the best known springs are the Vrnjačka Banja, Bukovička Banja, Vrujci, Sokobanja and Niška Banja. The hottest spring in Serbia is at Vranjska Banja (96°C)

In Serbia, the word Banja implies a spa town.

Slovakia

Slovakia is well known by its spa towns. The most famous is the city of Piešťany in Trnava Region. 
Other notable  spa towns in Slovakia include:

 Bardejov
 Brusno
 Bojnice
 Číž
 Dudince
 Liptovský Ján
 Lúčky
 Piešťany
 Rajecké Teplice
 Sklené Teplice
 Sliač
 Smrdáky
 Trenčianske Teplice
 Turčianske Teplice

Slovenia
Spa towns in Slovenia include Rogaška Slatina, Radenci, Čatež ob Savi, Dobrna, Dolenjske Toplice, Šmarješke Toplice, Moravske Toplice, Rimske Toplice, Laško and Topolšica. They offer accommodation in hotels, apartments, bungalows, and camp sites. The Slovenian words terme or toplice imply a spa town.

Spain
Spa towns in Spain include:
Alhama de Aragon
Panticosa in the high Pyrenees
Archena 
Caldes d'Estrac
Caldes de Montbui
Riofrío
Caldes de Malavella
Lanjarón
A Toxa, an island-spa in northwestern Galicia.
Mondariz
Arnedillo
Zestoa
Karrantza
Montemayor
 Caldas de Luna

Sweden 
 Ramlösa now a part of Helsingborg

Switzerland 
 Baden
 Bad Ragaz (Ragatz, also known as "Old Baths Pfäfers" or "Old Baths of Pfäfersin)
 Davos
 Lavey-les-Bains
 Leukerbad
 Schinznach Bad
 Yverdon-les-Bains
 Zurzach
 Ragatz

Taiwan

Taiwan is home to a number of towns and cities with tourism infrastructure centered on hot springs. These include:
Jiaoxi, Yilan
Wulai, New Taipei
Beitou District, Taipei City
Tai'an, Miaoli
Guguan, in Heping, Taichung

Ukraine
Morshyn
Truskavets

United Kingdom

Some but not all UK spa towns contain "Spa", "Wells", or "Bath" in their names, e.g., Matlock Bath. Some towns are designated Spa Heritage Towns. Two out of three of the English towns granted the title "Royal", Royal Leamington Spa and Royal Tunbridge Wells, are spa towns.

United States
Chena Hot Springs, Alaska
Eureka Springs, Arkansas
Hot Springs, Arkansas
Calistoga, California
Desert Hot Springs, California
Palm Springs, California
Pagosa Springs, Colorado
Steamboat Springs, Colorado
Safety Harbor, Florida
Warm Springs, Georgia
Lava Hot Springs, Idaho
West Baden Springs, Indiana
Mount Clemens, Michigan
Excelsior Springs, Missouri
Jemez Springs, New Mexico
Truth or Consequences, New Mexico
Gila Hot Springs, New Mexico
Ballston Spa, New York
Saratoga Springs, New York
Hot Springs, North Carolina
Hot Springs, South Dakota
Mineral Wells, Texas
Warm Springs, Virginia
Connell, Washington
Bath (Berkeley Springs), West Virginia
Waukesha, Wisconsin
Saratoga, Wyoming
Thermopolis, Wyoming

Terminology

Terms used in various countries:

in the Arab world - Hammam
in Bulgaria - Bani
in Chile - Termas
in Croatia - Toplice
in Cyprus - Loutra-Therma
in the Czech Republic - Lázně
in Ethiopia - Filwoha
in France - Bains, thermes
in Georgia - სამკურნალო წყლები
in Germany, Austria, and Switzerland - Bad, the first part of the names of most spa towns, a cognate to the English "bath" while "Therme" is used for the spa itself.
in Greece - Loutra-Therma
in Hungary - fürdő or -füred
in Italy - Terme
in Iran - Cheshme Ab-e-Garm" or "Cheshme Ab-e-Madani
in Japan - Onsen
in Korea - 온천 or 사우나
in Mexico- Termas or Balneario
in Peru - Cuzco, Cajamarca
in Poland - List of spa towns in Poland
in Portugal - Caldas or Termas 
in Russia - Минеральные воды or Лечебные воды
in Romania - Băile
in Slovakia - Liečebné kúpele
in Serbia - Banja
in Spain - Termas or Balneario
in Turkey - Termal or Kaplica
in Ukraine - Лікувальні води

See also

 Bukovička Banja
Spa
Resort architecture
Spa architecture
Spa resort
Hot spring
Sauna
Thermae
Mineral water
Hydrotherapy
Sanatorium
Great Spas of Europe, UNESCO World Heritage site

References

External links

 
Spas
Destination spas
Lists by country
Types of towns